Salem Welsh Church, or Salem Presbyterian Church, is a historic Presbyterian church located at Freedom in Cattaraugus County, New York. It is a Greek Revival style church building constructed 1854–1855. It was built as the Calvinistic Methodist Church by the Welsh settlers who migrated to this area from Herkimer and Oneida Counties in the 1840s and 1850s.  Regular services ended before World War I and the property has been maintained since 1926 by the Salem Cemetery Society, Inc.

It was listed on the National Register of Historic Places in 1995.

References

External links
History of the church from the Salem Cemetery Society
Historical marker/historic landmark for Salem Welsh Church in Freedom, NY

Churches on the National Register of Historic Places in New York (state)
Presbyterian churches in New York (state)
Greek Revival church buildings in New York (state)
Churches completed in 1855
19th-century Presbyterian church buildings in the United States
Churches in Cattaraugus County, New York
Welsh-American culture in New York (state)
Wooden churches in the United States
National Register of Historic Places in Cattaraugus County, New York